Kweon Lee-jun (born 24 October 1997) is a South Korean snowboarder. He competed in the 2018 Winter Olympics.

References

1997 births
Living people
Snowboarders at the 2018 Winter Olympics
South Korean male snowboarders
Olympic snowboarders of South Korea
Asian Games medalists in snowboarding
Snowboarders at the 2017 Asian Winter Games
Asian Games silver medalists for South Korea
Medalists at the 2017 Asian Winter Games
Universiade silver medalists for South Korea
Universiade medalists in snowboarding
Competitors at the 2019 Winter Universiade
21st-century South Korean people